New Mongol Bayangol Football Club is a football club based in Ulaanbaatar, Mongolia. They played in the Mongolian Premier League, the highest level of football in Mongolia, making their debut in the 2016 season.

History
Bayangol FC were founded in July 2013, when Paul Watson was contacted by Ulaanbaatar local Enkhjin Batsumber, asking if Watson would be interested in helping to start a new football team in the capital.

In the Summer of 2014, Coventry University student Jack Brazil was appointed as the club's manager.

In May 2016, Bayangol appointed British coach Shadab Iftikhar as their manager for their inaugural Premier League season.  

In July 2016, Bayangol signed a MoU with League of Ireland side Limerick.

On 24 August 2016 it was announced the club's name was changed to New Mongol Bayangol FC to reflect a youth development partnership with the New Mongol Academy.

Domestic history

Squad

As of July 2016

Honours
|1. Champions of the 2015 amateur league|
|2. Bronze medal (3rd place) of the 2015 1st league (2nd division)|
|3. Bronze medal (3rd place) of the 2015-2016 Futsal Cup|

Managers
Information correct as of match played 10 September 2016. Only competitive matches are counted.

Notes:

Affiliated clubs
  Limerick (2016–present)

References

External links
Official Facebook
Official Website

Football clubs in Mongolia